The Nyland and Tavastehus County Cavalry Regiment was a Swedish Army cavalry regiment located in the county of Nyland and Tavastehus that traced its origins back to the 17th Century. It was split in 1791.

History 
The regiment has its origin in the Nyland cavalry raised in 1618. In 1632, this unit was organized into a cavalry regiment. The regiment's soldiers were conscripted mainly from the county of Nyland and Tavastehus. It was one of the original eight Swedish cavalry regiments mentioned in the Swedish constitution of 1634. The regiment's first commander was Torsten Stålhandske. Finnish horsemen were also known as "Hakkapeliitat".

In the spring of 1700, the regiment was transferred to General Wellingk's army corps in Swedish Livonia. From 1702 on, the regiment, with six of its eight companies, had joined the main army. In 1705–1706 it was part of Carl Gustaf Rehnskiöld's corps. After the Battle of Poltava in 1709, the regiment was present at the capitulation in Perevolochna. The regiment had to be completely reraised. It was then stationed with the army in Finland. The regiment was part of General Armfeldt's army of 7,500 men which invaded Norway through Jämtland in August 1718.

The cavalry regiment was reorganized into Nyland and Tavastehus dragoon regiment in 1721. In 1791, the regiment was converted to infantry. The northern battalion was incorporated into Tavastehus county infantry regiment as its third battalion, while the southern battalion was incorporated into Nyland Infantry Regiment.

Campaigns 
 The Thirty Years' War 1630–1648
 The Great Northern War 1700–1721

Organization 
1690(?)

 Södra bataljonen
 Livskvadronen
 Majorens (Borgå) skvadron
 Helsing skvadron
 Raseborgs skvadron
 Norra bataljonen
 Överstelöjtnantens skvadron
 Nedre Hållola Skvadron
 Övre Hållola Skvadron
 Säxmäki Skvadron

Commanding officers

1625–1632 Åke Tott
1632–1644 Torsten Stålhandske
1644–1656 Henrik Horn 
1656–1669 Johan Galle 
1669–16?? Claes Uggla  
 Baranoff. 
1678–1687 Otto Vellingk 
1687–1700 Johan Ribbing
1700–1701 Adrian Magnus Klingsporre
1701–1706 Didrik Fredrik Patkull 
1707–1709 Anders Torstenson (1676-1709)  
1709–1713 Anders Erich Ramsay 
1713–1724 Reinhold Johan De la Barre
1725–1728 Axel Erik Roos
1728–1739 Carl Henrik Wrangel
1739–1742 Johan Carl Ramsay
1743–1746 Gustaf Gynterfelt 
1746–1759 Lars Åkerhielm 
1759–1762 Herman Fleming
1762–1767 Gustav Crispin Jernfeltz
1768–1769 Casimir Lewenhaupt 
1769–1772 Jakob Magnus Sprengtporten
1772–1776 Johan von Schwartzer
1776–1777 Erik Johan Stjernvall
1777–1779 Georg Gustaf Wrangel af Adinal
1779–1791 Robert Montgomery

Various

See also 

 List of Swedish regiments
 List of Swedish wars
 History of Sweden
 Provinces of Sweden

References 

 See the Swedish regiments article for general references.

Cavalry regiments of the Swedish Army
Military history of Finland